Ganga Prasad Yadav  is a former Governor of Sudurpashchim Province. He was appointed Governor, as per the Article 163 (2)  of the Constitution of Nepal by the President Bidya Devi Bhandari on the recommendation of the Council of Ministers of the Government of Nepal on 3 May 2021. He also served as a Deputy Speaker of Constituent Assembly of Nepal.

See also 
 Somnath Adhikari
  Rajesh Jha
  Bishnu Prasad Prasain	
  Sita Kumari Poudel
  Dharmanath Yadav
 Govinda Prasad Kalauni

References

Living people
Year of birth missing (living people)
Communist Party of Nepal (Unified Marxist–Leninist) politicians
Governors of Sudurpashchim Province
Nepal MPs 2022–present